Office Politics may refer to:

Workplace politics
Office Politics (House)
Office Politics (novel), a 1966 novel by Wilfred Sheed
Office Politics (album), of 2019 by The Divine Comedy